Lyonsiellidae is a taxonomic family of marine bivalve molluscs in the superfamily Verticordioidea.

Genera 
Genera within the family Lyonsiellidae include:

 Allogramma Dall, 1903
 Dallicordia Scarlato & Starobogatov, 1983
 Lyonsiella G.O. Sars, 1872
 Policordia Dall, Bartsch & Rehder, 1938

References

Anomalodesmata
Bivalve families